Rajendra Rawal is a Nepali professional football midfielder, who currently plays for Jawalakhel YC in the Martyr's Memorial A-Division League.

References

Living people
Nepalese footballers
Nepal international footballers
Association football forwards
Year of birth missing (living people)